MTA1 WORLD or just MTA1 is the first television channel of the MTA International satellite network. It was launched on 1 January 1994 and was initially named as AMP or Ahmadiyya Muslim Presentation. The name was later changed to Muslim Television Ahmadiyya or MTA International.

Background
The channel was established by Mirza Tahir Ahmad and became the First International Muslim channel to specifically broadcast a variety of Islamic programmes. After the launch of sister channels, the channel was renamed as MTA1. However, it is still loosely referred to as MTA or MTA International. Its programmes are broadcast throughout Europe, North America, South America and Asia. It is also available for live streaming via the Internet. MTA International is run and voluntarily funded by Ahmadis. The purpose of the channel was primarily to broadcast the sermons of the Khalifa. It now broadcasts a variety of programs in various global languages for the benefit of the international Muslim Community. Programs include news, sermons, documentaries and even Arabic language learning for children. Programs are broadcast mainly in Urdu, but several programs are also simultaneously translated and broadcast in other languages. MTA1 broadcast 24/7 and commercial-free with programs for all ages.

Programs

Muslim Television Ahmadiyya International is the main source of media for the Ahmadiyya Muslim community and also aims to spread the message of Islam around the world. Some of the key programs broadcast include the Friday Sermon by the current Ahmadiyya Caliphate, educational and cultural programs, world news, and a various Talk Shows. These can be watched on TV as well as through smartphone apps for Android, iOS and Nokia.

Due to the worldwide audience, a number of programs are simultaneously translated into different languages such as English, German, Bengali, French, Urdu and others. An example of this is the program Friday Sermon which is translated live simultaneously in at least 8 languages including Arabic, Swahili and Indonesian. This is later translated into more languages like Russian and Spanish etc. All together there can be 16 translations (more or less) per sermon.

Friday Sermon
Mirza Masroor Ahmad, the Caliph and worldwide head of the Ahmadiyya Muslim Community, delivers the Friday Sermon each Friday, usually from the Baitul Futuh Mosuqe in London. MTA broadcasts the Friday Sermon Live with up to 8 simultaneous translations, and also provides an online stream. Through MTA therefore, the Imam is able to address not just the congregation, but also the entire world. It gives the Imam a chance to advise all Muslims at the same time on urgent matters that face them. The Friday Sermon was the first program aired on MTA International in 1992 and is MTA's longest-running programme.

Question and Answer Session

Mirza Tahir Ahmad, the late Fourth Caliph of the Ahmadiyya Muslim Community answers questions from guests in sessions held around the world. Questions included, why do only women in Islam have to cover themselves? How can there be a prophet after the Prophet Muhammad? What is the future of western society? Are natural disasters a punishment from God? The Caliph’s style blended knowledge with humour allows for providing thought-provoking answers to common questions.

Bustan-e-Waqfe Nau and Gulshan-e-Waqfe Nau

Mirza Masroor Ahmad, accompanies Waqfe Nau children in the class in a learning but welcoming environment. There are three types of classes with reference to Gulshan-e-Waqfe Nau.

 Bustan-e-Waqfe Nau: This is with boys and girls under the age of 12
 Gulshan-e-Waqfe Nau Atfal: This is with boys between the ages of 12 and 15
 Gulshan-e-Waqfe Nau Khuddam: This is with boys above the age of 15
 Gulshan-e-Waqfe Nau Nasirat: This is with girls above the age of 12

Intekhab-e-Sukhan
Intikhab-e-Sukhan is hosted by Mubarak Suiddique that features popular videos and nazm, or poetry. Viewers can send messages to be read live on air and request particular nazms. The programme begins with a hamd, a poem expressing love and devotion to God, followed by a Naʽat praising the Prophet Muhammad. Intikhab-e-Sukhan includes poetry from some of the most exceptional poets of past and present. Couplets composed by Mirza Ghulam Ahmad are regularly featured.

Faith Matters

An Interactive program in English which allows viewers the opportunity to ask questions relating to faith in general. Questions asked vary widely in nature.

Rah-e-Huda

An Interactive program in Urdu which allows viewers the opportunity to ask questions relating to specifically Ahmadiyyat. Some of the questions asked include, concerning the second coming of the Messiah in the latter days, the prophecies, the death of Jesus and the Finality of Prophethood. The questions can be asked live via phone, fax, text or email.

Shotter Shondane

An Interactive program in Bengali which allows viewers the opportunity to ask questions mainly relating to Ahmadiyyat. The questions can be asked via phone or fax.

References

Muslim Television Ahmadiyya International
British Pakistani mass media
Television channels and stations established in 1994
Urdu-language television channels in the United Kingdom
Commercial-free television networks